The Journal of Dynamic Behavior of Materials is a quarterly peer-reviewed scientific journal published by Springer Science+Business Media on behalf  of the Society for Experimental Mechanics. Jennifer L. Jordan (Los Alamos National Laboratory) has been the editor-in-chief since 2020. The journal was established in 2015 with Eric N. Brown as the inaugural editor-in-chief.

Abstracting and indexing
The journal is abstracted and indexed in:
Astrophysics Data System
Ei Compendex
Emerging Sources Citation Index
ProQuest databases
Scopus

References

External links

English-language journals
Materials science journals
Springer Science+Business Media academic journals
Publications established in 2015
Quarterly journals
Hybrid open access journals